Luthuli Dlamini (born 13 March 1966) is a Zimbabwe-born South African film and television actor. He is best known for his portrayal of Stan Nyathi on the e.tv soap opera, Scandal!. Dlamini has also had roles on Generations, Jacob's Cross, InterSEXions, Rockville, Room, Tempy Pushas, and Uzalo.

Early life
Dlamini was born on 13 March 1966 in Bulawayo, Zimbabwe. He grew up in England spending his time between that country and his native Zimbabwe. "I was born in Zimbabwe in the late '60s and moved between Africa and Europe most of my life. I lived all the way through the Beatles craze of the UK and the liberation movement of Zimbabwe.

Career
From 2008-2009, He has played the leading role of Tombo Mbuli in the M-Net sitcom The Coconuts.
On July 4, 2013, he joined  Generations , television  show that was aired live on SABC 1, playing a role of Scott.
He also had played the role of Advocate  Zulu on Uzalo from season 1 to season 4.

Scandal! controversy
Dlamini initially notified the producers of Scandal! on 4 June 2007 that he had been ill and needed some time off. After a prolonged absence and no news from him, the producers of that show tried to reach him to no success, at which point they went to his house where they found that the house appeared to be uninhabited. After two weeks of no news from him, the police were notified and they discovered that he had been inside his house. He claimed that he had been sick and needed time to recuperate. On 28 June 2007, he was dismissed from Scandal! but later returned on a recurring basis to see out his character of Stan Nyathi.

Filmography

Television

Films

Achievements

Nice International Film Festival

References

External links

1966 births
Living people
People from Bulawayo
South African male soap opera actors